Dendermonde is a city in the Flemish province of East Flanders in Belgium. The municipality comprises the city of Dendermonde and the towns of Appels, Baasrode, Grembergen, Mespelare, Oudegem, Schoonaarde, and Sint-Gillis-bij-Dendermonde. Dendermonde is at the mouth of the river Dender, where it flows into the Scheldt. The town has a long-standing folkloric feud with Aalst, south along the same river, which dates from the Middle Ages.

The city is an administrative, commercial, educational, and medical centre for the surrounding region. The current mayor of Dendermonde is Piet Buyse (Christian Democratic and Flemish).

History

Origins to the 15th century
Some interesting La Tène artifacts were found in Appels, proof that this region of the Scheldt was inhabited in prehistory. Grave sites from the 2nd and 6th century also attest to dense settlement in Gallo-Roman and Merovingian times. In 843, the Treaty of Verdun placed Dendermonde in Lotharingia.  After the Norman invasions of 883, however, Baldwin II took over the region and incorporated it into the German part of the newly founded County of Flanders.

Otto II built a fort here in the 10th century, encouraging further settlements in the area. The town received its city charter in 1233 and grew quickly after that, thanks to a thriving cloth industry.  Several cloisters, chapels and churches, and a fortified defensive wall were built as well. A cloth hall and belfry were erected on the market square in the mid 14th century. The town's prosperity, however, gave rise to severe competition with cities such as Ghent and to occasional attacks and plunders by neighbours. In 1384, the whole area came under the control of the Valois dukes of Burgundy.

16th to 20th century

The 16th century saw a decline in Dendermonde's fortunes.  In 1572 Dendermonde was conquered by William the Silent.
The same year however Spanish troops under Duke Alexander Farnese of Parma, took over the city, looted and mostly destroyed it.  A decade later, the Spaniards built their own fortress between the Dender and the Scheldt. In 1667, it was France's turn, under Louis XIV, to advance on the city, but they were turned back when the defenders opened the dikes and flooded the countryside. The allied troops of the Netherlands and England, under the Duke of Marlborough, caused the heaviest damage in 1706.  The city was then fortified by the Austrians against further French ambitions.  After a last siege by Louis XV, the city could finally breathe to the point that the fortifications were dismantled a few decades later.

The second half of the 18th century was generally prosperous, with the advent of the Industrial Revolution and a local cotton industry.  After 1800, the port facilities were modernized and the first railways were laid down, allowing other industries (oil, shoe, leather…) to move in.

The onset of World War I in September 1914 was disastrous for the city as more than half of its housing and the city archives were either bombed or burned down.

21st century 
On August 19, 2006, 28 prisoners managed to escape Dendermonde prison. Seven of them were captured within hours. A few were later found in Italy and Russia. They managed to escape because the lock was old and rusty. They simply walked away, tied all their sheets together, climbed over the wall, jumped on a phone booth and ran away.

On 23 January 2009, a 20-year-old Flemish man named Kim De Gelder attacked a children's daycare centre in the village of Sint-Gillis-bij-Dendermonde, stabbing three people to death and wounding as many as twenty. One of the school teachers and two babies, aged 8 and 9 months, died in the attack. Italian singer Luciano Ligabue dedicated a song to the victims: , in his 2010 album, .

Main sights
The central market square (Grote Markt)
The Town Hall, housing an art collection
The Butcher's Hall (Dutch: Vleeshuismuseum), a museum with an archeological and historical collection. From the prehistory of the region to the 21st century
The Church of Our Lady (Dutch: Onze Lieve-Vrouwekerk) with two paintings by Anthony van Dyck
The béguinage is a UNESCO World Heritage Site since 1998.
The city hall and belfry have also been designated a World Heritage Site since 1999. The belfry houses a carillon and was formerly part of the Cloth Hall.
The Dendermonde Abbey, a Benedictine abbey famous for its library containing an original manuscript of Hildegard of Bingen, called the 'Dendermonde Codex'.
The Dendermonde-Puurs Steam Railway is a heritage railway, running  from Dendermonde to Puurs.
Jazz Center Flanders, archive, documentation center and museum

Events
Dendermonde likes to be known for its decennial procession, featuring the heroic horse: Ros Beiaard. Legend has this horse saving his master and his three brothers from capture by Charlemagne. The annual Parade of the three Giants of the Guilds Indian, Mars and Goliath, have the title of Masterpieces of the Oral and Intangible Heritage of Humanity by UNESCO. This parade takes place on the last Thursday of August.

Sport 

Dendermonde is home to Rugby Union club Dendermondse RC, champions of the Belgian Elite League in the 2011/12 season.

People
Vanessa Chinitor (born 1976), singer, born in Dendermonde
Rosiana Coleners, poetess (c.1500–second half of the 16th century)
Franz Courtens (1854–1943), painter, born in Dendermonde
Laurens De Bock (born 1992), footballer
Polydore de Keyser, Right Honourable Lord Mayor of London in 1887
Alwin de Prins (born 1978), competitive swimmer
Pierre-Jean De Smet (1801–1873), missionary among Native Americans
Geert De Vlieger (born 1971), Belgian international soccer player
Jan De Vos (1844–1923), mayor of Antwerp
Philippe Geubels (born 1981), stand-up comedian
Emmanuel Hiel, poet and prose writer (1834–1899)
Thomas Kaminski Belgian international goalkeeper
Kim Kay (pseudonym of Kim Van Hee) (born 1978), Belgian singer, born in Dendermonde
Willem Kerricx, sculptor (1652–1719)
Fernand Khnopff, painter (1858–1921)
Clément Loret (1833–1909), organist and composer, naturalized French
Caroline Maes (born 1982), tennis player
Johannes Ockeghem (c. 1410–1497), composer, said to be born in Dendermonde
Bob Straetman (born 1997), footballer
Ivo Van Damme (1954–1976), middle distance runner
James Oliver Van de Velde (1795–1855), bishop of Chicago and, later, of Mississippi
Pat Van Den Hauwe (born 1960), Welsh international soccer player
Michael Pauluzen Van der Voort (c. 1615–1690), early resident of New Amsterdam
Annelies Verbeke (born 1976), author
Frans Verhas (c. 1827c. 1897), painter
Jan Verhas (1834–1886), painter
Dirk Verhofstadt (born 1955), political scientist, born and raised in Dendermonde, brother of Guy Verhofstadt
Guy Verhofstadt (born 1953), former Belgian prime minister, born and raised in Dendermonde, brother of Dirk Verhofstadt
Remi Vermeiren (born 1940), businessman, born in Dendermonde
Cornelis Columbanus Vrancx, writer (1529–1615)

Twin cities 

 Geldrop, Netherlands
 Nienburg, Germany
 Blagoevgrad, Bulgaria

See also
Inverted Dendermonde, the most valuable Belgian stamp

References

External links

 - only available in Dutch
Youth community site for Dendermonde - only available in Dutch

 
Municipalities of East Flanders
Populated places in East Flanders
World Heritage Sites in Belgium